Reginald Foster may refer to:
 R. E. Foster (Reginald Erskine Foster, 1878–1914), England cricket and football captain
 Reginald Foster (Latinist) (1939–2020), American Latin expert and Roman Catholic priest